Texadelphia is a cheesesteak sandwich restaurant chain established in Austin, Texas in 1981 by Philadelphia native Joel Stanley. Texadelphia has had locations in and around Austin, San Antonio, Dallas, Houston, the Rio Grande Valley, and Oklahoma City. The name is a portmanteau of "Texas" & "Philadelphia."

Texadelphia's food is a combination of East Coast-style cheesesteak sandwiches, Tex-Mex, and vegetarian, with its signature style of replacing bell peppers with jalapeños and a choice of sauces.

When the original restaurant relocated in 1985 from US Hwy 183 and Burnet Rd to Guadalupe Street across from The University of Texas, it became a long-running fixture of The Drag and popular for students and faculty at the university until its eventual closure. On May 10, 2013 Texadelphia closed its Guadalupe Street location after 28 years due to high renovation costs for the building.

In 2008 Texadelphia founder Joel Stanley sold the company to a group of investors and the headquarters was moved from Austin to Dallas. At that time there were 19 restaurants in the chain. Texadelphia restaurants are independently owned franchises.

Texadelphia closed its Lakeline restaurant leaving the only Austin-area restaurant in Sunset Valley. The restaurant currently has eight locations.

References

External links

Restaurants in Texas
Restaurants established in 1981
Companies based in Austin, Texas
Fast-food chains of the United States
American companies established in 1981
1981 establishments in Texas